Josef Košťálek (31 August 1909 in Kladno – 21 November 1971) was a Czech footballer.

He played for Sparta Prague and the Czechoslovakia national football team, for whom he played 43 matches, scoring two goals, and appeared in the 1934 and 1938 World Cups. In 1938, he scored in extra time against the Netherlands to put Czechoslovakia into the quarterfinals.

References 

1909 births
1971 deaths
Czech footballers
Czechoslovak footballers
AC Sparta Prague players
1934 FIFA World Cup players
1938 FIFA World Cup players
Czechoslovakia international footballers
Sportspeople from Kladno
Association football midfielders
People from the Kingdom of Bohemia